The North Shore (New Brunswick) Regiment is a Primary Reserve infantry regiment of the Canadian Army, and is part of the 5th Canadian Division's 37 Canadian Brigade Group. The regiment is headquartered in Bathurst, New Brunswick, with sub-units located in Newcastle (present day Miramichi), Campbellton and Moncton.

Lineage

The North Shore (New Brunswick) Regiment 
Originated 25 February 1870 in Chatham, New Brunswick, as "The 73rd Northumberland New Brunswick" Battalion of Infantry
Re-designated 8 May 1900 as the 73rd Northumberland Regiment
Re-designated 15 March 1920 as The Northumberland (New Brunswick) Regiment
Re-designated 1 April 1922 as The North Shore (New Brunswick) Regiment
Re-designated 7 November 1940 as the 2nd (Reserve) Battalion, The North Shore (New Brunswick) Regiment
Re-designated 13 April 1946 as The North Shore (New Brunswick) Regiment
Amalgamated 30 September 1954 with the 28th Field Battery, RCA and re-designated as the 2nd Battalion, The New Brunswick Regiment (North Shore)
Re-designated 18 May 1956 as the 2nd Battalion, The Royal New Brunswick Regiment (North Shore)
Reorganized 7 June 2012 as a separate regiment and re-designated The North Shore (New Brunswick) Regiment

28th Field Battery, RCA
Originated 18 December 1868 in Newcastle, New Brunswick, when a "field battery at Newcastle, County of Northumberland" was authorized 
Re-designated 1 July 1894 as the No. 12 "Newcastle" Field Battery
Re-designated 28 December 1895 as the 12th "Newcastle" Field Battery, CA
Re-designated 2 February 1920 as the (Newcastle) Battery, CFA
Re-designated 12 March 1920 as the 90th (Newcastle) Battery, CFA
Re-designated 1 July 1925 as the 90th (Newcastle) Field Battery, CA
Re-designated 15 May 1927 as the 28th (Newcastle) Field Battery, CA
Re-designated 3 June 1935 as the 28th (Newcastle) Field Battery, RCA
Re-designated 28th (Reserve) (Newcastle) Field Battery, RCA
Re-designated 7 November 1940 as the 28th (Reserve) Field Battery, RCA
Re-designated 21 September 1945 as the 28th Field Battery, RCA
Amalgamated 30 September 1954 with The North Shore (New Brunswick) Regiment

Lineage chart

Lineage of the North Shore (New Brunswick Regiment)

Perpetuations

War Of 1812
1st Battalion, Northumberland County Regiment
2nd Battalion, Northumberland County Regiment
3rd Battalion, Northumberland County Regiment
1st Battalion, Saint John County Regiment
1st Battalion, York County Regiment
2nd Battalion, York County Regiment

The Great War
132nd Battalion (North Shore), CEF
165th Battalion (Acadiens), CEF
28th Field Battery, Canadian Field Artillery, CEF

Operational history

The Great War
Details of the 73rd Northumberland Regiment were called out on active service on 6 August 1914 for local protective duty.

The 132nd Battalion (North Shore), CEF was authorized on 22 December 1915 and embarked for Great Britain on 26 October 1916. There it provided reinforcements for the Canadian Corps until 28 January 1917, when its personnel were absorbed by the 13th Reserve Battalion, CEF. The battalion was subsequently disbanded on 21 May 1917.

The 165th Battalion (Acadiens), CEF was authorized on 22 December 1915 and embarked for Great Britain on 28 March 1917.  On 7 April 1917, its personnel were absorbed by the 13th Reserve Battalion, CEF to provide reinforcements for the Canadian Corps. The battalion was subsequently disbanded on 15 April 1918.

The 28th Field Battery, CFA, CEF was authorized on 7 November 1914 and embarked for Great Britain on 9 August 1915. The battery disembarked in France on 21 January 1916, where it provided field artillery support as part of the 7th Brigade, CFA, CEF in France and Flanders until 19 March 1917, when its personnel were absorbed by the 15th Field Battery, CFA, CEF and 16th Field Battery, CFA, CEF. The battery was disbanded on 1 November 1920.

Second World War
 
Details of The North Shore (New Brunswick) Regiment were called out on service on 26 August 1939 and then placed on active service on 1 September 1939 as The North Shore (New Brunswick) Regiment, CASF (Details), for local protection duties. The details called out on active service were subsequently disbanded on 31 December 1940.

The regiment mobilized The North Shore (New Brunswick) Regiment, CASFfor active service on 24 May 1940. It was re-designated  as the 1st Battalion, The North Shore (New Brunswick) Regiment, CASF on 7 November 1940. It embarked for Great Britain on 18 July 1941. On D-Day, 6 June 1944, it landed on JUNO Beach in Normandy, France, as part of the 8th Infantry Brigade, 3rd Canadian Infantry Division, and it continued to fight in North-West Europe until the end of the war. The overseas battalion  disbanded on 15 January 1946.

During the Second World War, the regiment was first stationed in Woodstock, New Brunswick and then Sussex, New Brunswick. When it shipped overseas, it was initially stationed in Liverpool, after that it moved to Scotland near the castle of the Duke of Argyll.

On June 6, 1944, the regiment participated in the landing on Juno Beach, landing on Nan Red sector and losing nearly 50 men. On June 10, it liberated the town of Saint-Aubin-sur-Mer, Calvados. Newsreel footage of the North Shore Regiment landing under fire taken by the Canadian Army Film and Photo Unit became one of the most-used film depictions of the Allied D-Day landing.

On July 4, 1944, the men of the North Shore Regiment participated in Operation Windsor, the attack on the Carpiquet airfield. It lost nearly 130 men, and it was later known by the regiment's chaplain as the "graveyard of the regiment". 
The regiment later fought in Caen and all through France, continuously advancing with the 8th Canadian Infantry Brigade. It fought in places like Ranville, Bourguebus Ridge, Falaise, Quesnay Wood, the Laison and Chambois.

It helped clear the coast of France in late August and early September 1944, then it advanced into the Netherlands, taking part in the Battle of the Scheldt. It fought in Breskens Pocket in flooded fields and harsh conditions. After the Scheldt, it moved onto the rest of the Netherlands, fighting near the Bergsche Maas River at Kapelsche Veer.

In February 1945, it moved into Germany via amphibious landing. It fought in the Rhineland, the Hochwald, but then it doubled-back to the Netherlands and conquered the Twente Canal, and liberated Zutphen where it met its most brutal urban fighting since Caen. It then moved back into Germany in April, and it ended the war on German soil.

On 1 June 1945, a second Active Force component of the regiment was mobilized for service with the Canadian Army Occupation Force in Germany, as the 3rd Battalion, The North Shore (New Brunswick) Regiment, CIC, CAOF. The battalion disbanded on 13 April 1946.

The 28th (Newcastle) Field Battery, RCA, in conjunction with the 89th Field Battery, RCA, mobilized the '28th/89th Field Battery, RCA, CASF for active service on 1 September 1939. This unit reorganized as two separate batteries on 1 January 1941, designated as the 28th (Newcastle) Field Battery, RCA, CASF and the 89th Field Battery, RCA, CASF. It embarked for Great Britain on 25 August 1940. On 8 July 1944, it landed in France as a sub-unit of the 5th Field Regiment, RCA, 2nd Canadian Infantry Division, where it continued to fight in North-West Europe until the end of the war. The overseas battery disbanded on 21 September 1945.

War In Afghanistan
The regiment contributed personnel to the various Task Forces which served in Afghanistan between 2002 and 2014.

Battle honours
In the list below, battle honours in capitals were awarded for participation in large operations and campaigns, while those in lowercase indicate honours granted for more specific battles. Bold type indicates honours emblazoned on the regimental colour.

War of 1812

 
 
(both awarded in commemoration of the New Brunswick Fencible Infantry (104th Regiment of Foot)

Honorary distinction: The non-emblazonable honorary distinction  (partly awarded in commemoration of the New Brunswick Fencibles)

The Great War

The Second World War

Armoury

Notable Members 

 Archie MacNaughton

Order of precedence

References

Further reading

External links
 
 Regimental history
 The Canadian Encyclopedia
 D-Day 75th anniversary Royal Canadian Mint Coin Company North Shore Regiment
 D-Day Landing of A Company North Shore Regiment

North Shore (New Brunswick) Regiment
Infantry regiments of Canada
Bathurst, New Brunswick
Campbellton, New Brunswick
Military units and formations of New Brunswick
Infantry regiments of Canada in World War II
Military units and formations established in 1870